The Stadion  Birkenwiese  is a football stadium in Dornbirn in the Austrian state of Vorarlberg. It is the home ground of FC Dornbirn 1913, which plays in the 2nd division.

History
The area of the municipal sports field Birkenwiese was built in 1935 along with the neighbouring settlement. After promotion of FC Dornbirn to the 2nd league 2010, the city council decided to adapt the existing stadium area to make it suitable for the Bundesliga, especially with floodlight.

References

Football venues in Austria
Football venues in Europe
Sports venues in Vorarlberg
FC Dornbirn 1913